Coniston is a village and civil parish in the Furness region of Cumbria, England. In the 2001 census the parish had a population of 1,058, decreasing at the 2011 census to 928. Historically part of Lancashire, it is in the southern part of the Lake District National Park, between Coniston Water, the third longest lake in the Lake District, and Coniston Old Man.

History
Coniston grew as both a farming village, and to serve local copper and slate mines. It grew in popularity as a tourist location during the Victorian era, thanks partially to the construction of a branch of the Furness Railway, which opened to passenger traffic in 1859 and terminated at Coniston railway station.

The poet and social critic John Ruskin also popularised the village, buying the mansion Brantwood on the eastern side of Coniston Water in 1871. Before his death, he rejected the option to be buried in Westminster Abbey, instead being laid to rest in the churchyard of St Andrew's, Coniston. Ruskin Museum, established in 1901, is both a memorial to Ruskin and a local museum covering the history and heritage of Coniston Water and the Lake District.

The philosopher R.G. Collingwood is buried in Coniston.

The painter Henry Robinson Hall lived and worked and was buried in Coniston.

Donald Campbell added to the profile of the village and lake when he broke four World Water Speed Records on the lake in the 1950s. His body and boat (Bluebird K7) were discovered and recovered by divers in 2001 and he was buried in the new graveyard in Coniston in September 2001. A new wing has been built at the Ruskin Museum to accommodate the fully restored Bluebird K7 boat. It opened in late 2009 with the K7 due to arrive in late 2011 or early 2012.

The whole village was powered by hydroelectricity during the 1920s but this became so heavily taxed that the people there were forced to return to the national grid. Since 7 March 2007 a hydro-electric scheme has been in use to power up to 300 homes; being sited near the original.

Etymology

Coniston was called "Coningeston" in the 12th century, a name derived from konungr, the Old Norse for king, and tūn the Old English for farmstead or village. This would give the village the title of "The king's estate". Ekwall speculated that this town could have been the centre of a 'small Scandinavian mountain kingdom'.

Geography
Coniston is located on the western shore of the northern end of Coniston Water. It sits at the mouth of Coppermines Valley and Yewdale Beck, which descend from the Coniston Fells, historically the location of ore and slate mining. Coniston's location thus developed as a farming village and transport hub, serving these areas. Coniston was situated in the very north-west of the historic county of Lancashire, with Coniston Old Man forming the county's highest point.

Governance
Coniston is part of the Westmorland and Lonsdale parliamentary constituency, of which Tim Farron is the current MP representing the Liberal Democrats.

Before Brexit, it was in the North West England European Parliamentary Constituency.

For Local Government purposes, it is in the Coniston and Crake Valley  Ward of South Lakeland District Council. The total population of this ward as taken at the 2011 Census was 1,575. It belongs to the Broughton + Coniston Division of Cumbria County Council.

The village also has its own Parish Council; Coniston Parish Council.

Leisure and tourism
The creation of the Lake District National Park in 1951 provided a boost to tourism, with attractions such as the Ruskin Museum and ferry services across the lake developing. Coniston is a popular spot for hill-walking and rock-climbing; there are fine walks to be had on the nearby Furness Fells and Grizedale Forest, and some of the finest rock in the Lake District on the eastern face of Dow Crag,  from the village. The Grizedale Stages rally also takes place in Coniston, using the surrounding Grizedale and Broughton Moor (or Postlethwaite Allotment) forests. The village is also home to a number of hotels and two youth hostels, one at the edge of the village, the other in the nearby Coppermines Valley.

The village also has a football team, Coniston AFC, who play their home games at Coniston sports and social centre.

Climate

As with the rest of the British Isles, Coniston experiences a maritime climate with cool summers and mild winters. Rainfall is high, at not much under 2000mm a year. Temperature extremes have ranged from  during February 1986, to  during August 1990. The nearest Met Office weather station is Grizedale, around 2.5 miles to the South East.

Mining and minerals
Two slate quarries still operate at Coniston, one in Coppermines Valley, the other at Brossen Stone on the east side of the Coniston Old Man. Both work Coniston's volcanic slates, being blue at Low-Brandy Crag in Coppermines Valley, and light green at Brossen Stone (bursting stone). The scenery around Coniston derives from Coniston Limestone and rocks of the Borrowdale Volcanic Group.

Services
Coniston is also an important local centre, with a secondary school (John Ruskin School), primary school (Coniston Church of England Primary School), bank, petrol station and other such services. It has also repeatedly been highly placed in the Village of the Year award, winning it in 1997.

Twinning
The village is twinned with Illiers-Combray. The French village is associated with Marcel Proust for whom Ruskin's work was a source of inspiration.

Gallery

See also 

Listed buildings in Coniston, Cumbria
Coniston Hall
Coniston Mountain Rescue Team
John Ruskin School
Henry Robinson Hall

References

External links

 Coniston Community Website
 Coniston Mountain Rescue Team
 Coniston Webcam – A view of Coniston village.
 Lakelandcam- daily walkabout photos centered on Coniston and environs
 Cumbria County History Trust: Church Coniston (nb: provisional research only - see Talk page)
 Cumbria County History Trust: Hawkshead and Monk Coniston with Skelwith (nb: provisional research only – see Talk page)

 
Villages in Cumbria
Furness
Civil parishes in Cumbria